Frederick Temple Hamilton-Temple-Blackwood, 3rd Marquess of Dufferin and Ava,  (26 February 1875 – 21 July 1930), styled Lord Frederick Blackwood between 1888 and 1918, was a British soldier and politician. He died in an aircraft crash in 1930 at the age of 55.

Early life
Lord Dufferin was born on 26 February 1875 in Ottawa, Ontario, Canada, during his father's term as Governor General of Canada. He was the fourth son of Frederick Hamilton-Temple-Blackwood, 1st Marquess of Dufferin and Ava and Hariot Hamilton-Temple-Blackwood, Marchioness of Dufferin and Ava. While his father was Viceroy and Governor-General of India in the 1880s, his mother was known for leading an initiative to improve medical care for women in British India.

Career
Hamilton-Temple-Blackwood joined the 9th Lancers as a second lieutenant on 11 August 1897. He was promoted to lieutenant on 9 October 1899, and served with his regiment during the Second Boer War from 1899 to 1901, where he was present at the engagements at Belmont, Enslin, Modder River, Magersfonstein, the relief of Kimberley, and the advance to Bloemfontein and Pretoria. He was also present at the subsequent fighting in the Transvaal, Orange River Colony and Cape Colony, where he was badly wounded on Christmas Eve 1900. Twice mentioned in despatches (including 31 March 1900), he was awarded the Distinguished Service Order (DSO) in November 1900 for his service during the war.

Hamilton-Temple-Blackwood retired from the army in 1913 with the rank of captain.

First World War
After leaving the army, Hamilton-Temple-Blackwood was appointed military secretary to the Governor General of Australia, Sir Ronald Munro-Ferguson (later Viscount Novar), who was his brother-in-law. Following the outbreak of the First World War, he rejoined his old regiment, the 9th Lancers, and was seriously wounded while serving on the Western Front in October 1914 and was subsequently transferred to the Grenadier Guards. He was again seriously wounded in the autumn of 1915, having returned to duty for only three days. He served as a staff captain in the Guards Division in 1916 and was seconded to the Machine Gun Corps as an instructor in 1918. After the war he was president of the Ulster Ex-Servicemen's Association.

Late career
Hamilton-Temple-Blackwood succeeded to the marquessate on the death of his elder brother, Terence Hamilton-Temple-Blackwood, 2nd Marquess of Dufferin and Ava, on 7 February 1918. His eldest brother Archibald, Earl of Ava had been killed in action at Waggon Hill in the Boer War in January 1900, while his other brother, Lord Basil Blackwood, had perished in an attack on German trenches in July 1917.

Lord Dufferin was elected to the Senate of the Parliament of Northern Ireland in 1921, where he served as Speaker from 1921 to 1930, and was sworn of the Privy Council of Ireland on 16 September 1921 and of the Privy Council of Northern Ireland on 12 December 1922. He was an Royal Naval Reserve (RNVR) aide-de-camp to King George V and was appointed Vice-Admiral of Ulster by the King in 1923, a post which his father had held.

Personal life
Lord Dufferin was married on 10 June 1908 to Brenda Woodhouse, only daughter of Major Robert Woodhouse, of Orford House, Bishop's Stortford, Hertfordshire. They had two children:

 Basil Sheridan Hamilton-Temple-Blackwood, 4th Marquess of Dufferin and Ava (1909–1945), who married Maureen Constance, the second daughter of Hon. Arthur Ernest Guinness (a son of Edward Guinness, 1st Earl of Iveagh).
 Lady Veronica Brenda Hamilton-Temple-Blackwood (1910–1971), who married firstly Antony Hornby, second son of St John Hornby, of Shelley House, Chelsea and Chantemarle, Dorset, on 17 December 1931 (div. 1940) and has issue by the marriage; secondly Squadron Leader E. H. Maddick of the Royal Air Force in October 1941 (div. 1947); thirdly Captain Thomas Andrew Hussey CBE of the Royal Navy on 15 June 1947 (div. 1956); and fourthly to Peter Rebuck Wolfe in July 1956.

On 21 July 1930, Lord Dufferin was flying with a party of friends from Berck, a small village in France near Le Touquet, back to England when the aircraft crashed outside Meopham, Kent, killing all those on board. The others in the party were Sir Edward Simons Ward, Bt.; Viscountess Ednam, the wife of Viscount Ednam (heir to the Earl of Dudley) and a daughter of Cromartie Sutherland-Leveson-Gower, 4th Duke of Sutherland; and Mrs Loeffler, a well-known society hostess, along with the pilot, Lt. Col. George Lochart Henderson and the assistant pilot, Mr C. D. Shearing. Lord Dufferin was buried in the family burial ground at Clandeboye, County Down.

Lord Dufferin's widow married again after his death to Henry Charles Somers Augustus Somerset (1874–1945), the only son of Lord Henry Somerset (himself the brother of Henry Somerset, 9th Duke of Beaufort) on 28 January 1932. Mrs Somerset died on 17 July 1946.

Arms

References

External links
 

1875 births
1930 deaths
Members of the Privy Council of Ireland
Members of the Privy Council of Northern Ireland
Companions of the Distinguished Service Order
British Army personnel of the Second Boer War
British Army personnel of World War I
9th Queen's Royal Lancers officers
Grenadier Guards officers
Members of the Senate of Northern Ireland 1921–1925
Members of the Senate of Northern Ireland 1925–1929
Members of the Senate of Northern Ireland 1929–1933
Victims of aviation accidents or incidents in England
Frederick
Ulster Unionist Party members of the Senate of Northern Ireland
3
Royal Naval Volunteer Reserve personnel